This is a list of ambassadors of the United States to Estonia.

The United States has maintained continuous official diplomatic relations with Estonia (as well as Latvia and Lithuania) since 1922, when one ambassador, resident in Riga, Latvia, was appointed to all three nations. Relations with the three nations were broken after the Soviet invasion of the republics in 1940 at the beginning of World War II. The United States never recognized the legitimacy of the Soviet occupation of the three Baltic nations, nor the legitimacy of the governments of those states under Soviet occupation. Hence, diplomatic relations were not resumed until 1991 after the collapse of the Soviet Union.

The U.S. Embassy in Estonia is located in Tallinn.

Ambassadors

See also
Embassy of the United States, Tallinn
Estonian Embassy, Washington, D.C.
Estonia – United States relations
Foreign relations of Estonia
Ambassadors of the United States

Notes

References
United States Department of State: Background notes on Estonia

External links
 United States Department of State: Chiefs of Mission for Estonia
 United States Department of State: Estonia
 United States Embassy in Tallinn

Estonia

United States